Saxoceras is a genus of very evolute schlotheimiid ammonoids from the Lower Jurassic.

The shell of Saxoceras is discoidal, bearing strong, generally straight ribs that arise on the umbilical shoulder and thicken in the middle of the venter. Similar Waehneroceras has ribs that curve forward as they approach the venter, and Kammerkarites has finer ribs with secondaries. Both are also evolute schlotheimiids with all whorls exposed. Epamminites of the Arietitidae is similar from the side but has a smooth band running along the venter with a median keel.

Distribution 
British Columbia, France and Alaska

References 

 W. J. Arkell et al., 1957. Mesozoic Ammonoidea, Treatise on invertebrate Paleontology, Part L, Mollusca 4. Geological Society of America and University of Kansas Press.

Jurassic ammonites
Schlotheimiidae
Ammonitida genera
Ammonites of Europe